Grant County Airport  is a county-owned, public-use airport in Grant County, Nebraska, United States. It is located one nautical mile (2 km) northwest of the central business district of Hyannis, Nebraska. This airport is included in the National Plan of Integrated Airport Systems for 2011–2015, which categorized it as a general aviation facility.

Facilities and aircraft 
Grant County Airport covers an area of 88 acres (36 ha) at an elevation of 3,710 feet (1,131 m) above mean sea level. It has one runway designated 17/35 with an asphalt surface measuring 3,975 by 50 feet (1,212 x 15 m). For the 12-month period ending June 29, 2011, the airport had 1,825 general aviation aircraft operations, an average of 152 per month.

References

External links 
 Aerial image as of May 1999 from USGS The National Map
 

Airports in Nebraska
Buildings and structures in Grant County, Nebraska